Luigi "Geno" Auriemma (born March 23, 1954) is an Italian-born American college basketball coach and, since 1985, the head coach of the University of Connecticut Huskies women's basketball team. , he has led UConn to 17 undefeated conference seasons (including eight consecutive), of which six were undefeated overall seasons, with 11 NCAA Division I national championships, the most in women's college basketball history, and has won eight national Naismith College Coach of the Year awards. Auriemma was the head coach of the United States women's national basketball team from 2009 through 2016, during which time his teams won the 2010 and 2014 World Championships, and gold medals at the 2012 and 2016 Summer Olympics, going undefeated in all four tournaments. Auriemma was inducted into the Naismith Memorial Basketball Hall of Fame and the Women's Basketball Hall of Fame in 2006.

Early life
Auriemma emigrated with his family from Montella in Southern Italy to Norristown, Pennsylvania when he was seven years old, and he spent the rest of his childhood there. Auriemma had to teach himself how to speak the English language coming to the United States. After graduating from West Chester University of Pennsylvania in 1977, Auriemma was hired as an assistant coach at Saint Joseph's University, where he worked in 1978 and 1979.  Prior to coaching at Saint Joseph's University he began his career coaching women's basketball at Bishop McDevitt HS in Wyncote Pennsylvania.  He then took a two-year absence from college basketball, serving as an assistant coach at his former high school, Bishop Kenrick, before assuming an assistant coaching position with the University of Virginia Cavaliers women's team in 1981. Auriemma became a naturalized United States citizen in 1994 at the age of 40, noting in his autobiography that he finally decided to naturalize when his University of Connecticut team was slated to tour Italy that summer and he was concerned about potential problems, as he had never done any required national service in his birth country.

When he was growing up, his favorite team was the 1970s New York Knicks coached by Red Holzman.

For many years, Auriemma and his wife, Kathy, maintained a home in Avalon, New Jersey, to be near their parents in the Philadelphia area.

University of Connecticut career
Prior to Auriemma's arrival in 1985, the Huskies Women's Basketball team had posted only one winning season in its history. The decision to hire Auriemma was part of the university's commitment to better fund women's sports. Auriemma's was the final interview scheduled by the search staff. Most of the other candidates were highly qualified, and most were female. One of those included in the interview process was Chris Dailey, who would become Auriemma's assistant and is currently the associate head coach. Dailey was identified as the candidate most likely to receive an offer if Auriemma turned down the position.

Connecticut quickly rose to prominence after Auriemma was hired in August 1985. After finishing 12–15 in Auriemma's first season (his only losing season), the Huskies notched their first-ever 20-win season, first conference title and first NCAA Tournament appearance. Connecticut has finished above .500 for 33 consecutive seasons, including six undefeated seasons (1994–95, 2001–02, 2008–09, 2009–10, 2013–14, and 2015–16) and three NCAA record streaks of 111, 90 and 70 consecutive wins. On December 21, 2010, Auriemma led UConn to its 89th consecutive victory, one more than the all-time NCAA men's wins record of 88 held by UCLA; the streak ended at 90 wins. The Huskies subsequently broke their own record with an astounding 111-game winning streak that began in 2014 and finally ended in 2017. They have also appeared in every NCAA Tournament since 1989–as of the end of the 2018–19 season, the third-longest active consecutive appearances streak in Division I.

At the end of the 2014–15 season, Auriemma's record as a head coach was 917–134, for an 87.3 winning percentage. That winning percentage is the highest among Division I active coaches.  His career at UConn also includes 20 seasons with 30 or more wins. UConn has won eleven national championships under Auriemma (1995, 2000, 2002, 2003, 2004, 2009, 2010, 2013, 2014, 2015, and 2016) and made the Final Four 20 times (1991, 1995, 1996, 2000–2004, 2008–2019). Auriemma has also guided UConn to 21 conference regular season titles and 20 conference tournament titles. They lost 17 conference games in the last two decades of play in the Big East Conference, and have never lost a conference game since the old Big East reorganized as the American Athletic Conference in 2013.

With the win in 2016, Auriemma passed UCLA men's coach John Wooden for most college basketball championships, and the Huskies became the first Division I women's basketball team to win four straight national championships.

The team has been especially successful on its home court in the Harry A. Gampel Pavilion on the UConn campus in Storrs, Connecticut, and in the larger XL Center in Hartford; they tied an NCAA women's basketball record with 69 consecutive home wins between 2000 and 2003. That record was broken in 2011. The last home loss was to Villanova in the game that ended their 70-game winning streak. Moreover, between Auriemma's arrival and the close of the 2005 season, UConn won 295 games versus just 31 losses. The team set Big East Conference records for both single-game and season-long attendance.

Auriemma is also known for cultivating individual players, and the 13 multiple-All-America players—Rebecca Lobo, Jennifer Rizzotti, Kara Wolters, Nykesha Sales, Svetlana Abrosimova, Sue Bird, Swin Cash, Diana Taurasi, Tina Charles, Maya Moore, Stefanie Dolson, Bria Hartley and Breanna Stewart—whom Auriemma has coached have combined to win eight Naismith College Player of the Year awards, seven Wade Trophies, and nine NCAA basketball tournament Most Outstanding Player awards. (The UConn athletics website also notes that, through 2006–07, every recruited freshman who has finished her eligibility at UConn has graduated with a degree.)

Since achieving its first #1 ranking in the 1994–95 season, UConn under Auriemma is 186–10 when playing as the nation's #1 team. At the end of the 2009–10 season, he had a record of 127–52 against top 25 opponents and a 57–35 record against top 10 opponents. He won his 600th game on New Year's Eve 2006, accomplishing the feat in 716 games, tying him with Phillip Kahler for the fastest women's basketball coach to reach that milestone. Auriemma won his 700th game on November 27, 2009 in 822 total games, becoming the fastest head coach to that milestone in the history of college basketball at any level, men or women. He is now one of eight active women's college basketball coaches to have 700 or more wins. Auriemma became the sixth coach in women's basketball history to reach 800 career victories on March 6, 2012, also reaching 800 career wins faster than any coach in the history of college basketball men or women at any division level in just 928 career games. On February 3, 2015, Auriemma notched his 900th victory in only 1,034 games, reaching this milestone also faster than any college coach in history. Auriemma was a member of the inaugural class (2006) of inductees to the University of Connecticut women's basketball Huskies of Honor recognition program.
Auriemma's 2013–2018 salary is $10.9 million.

Staged shot incident
Auriemma created controversy in 1998 when he arranged with Villanova coach Harry Perretta to orchestrate a shot at the beginning of their scheduled game.  University of Connecticut's top player, Nykesha Sales, was two points short of breaking the team record for most points in a career when she ruptured her right Achilles tendon in the second to last game of the season against Notre Dame.  When the following game against Villanova began, Villanova players allowed Connecticut to win the tip off and then pass the ball down to Sales who was standing underneath the basket.  She laid the ball in to break the record.  Connecticut players then stood back and allowed Villanova an uncontested layup of their own before beginning regular play.

Rivalries
The rivalry between the Huskies and the University of Tennessee Lady Vols extended to Auriemma's relationship with Volunteers counterpart Pat Summitt, who retired in 2012 and died in 2016. The two, through print and broadcast media, were often at odds. At the end of the 2009–10 season, Auriemma had slightly surpassed Summitt among active Division I coaches for career winning percentage, with Auriemma at 85.8 and Summitt at 84.1. In 2007, Summitt, who believed Auriemma had used less-than-honorable tactics in his successful recruitment of Maya Moore, canceled the yearly game between the two programs.

Former UConn men's basketball coach Jim Calhoun has been called Auriemma's "unfriendly rival", and he once mocked the women's team's fan base as the "world's largest nursing home." When asked about their relationship in 2001, Auriemma said, "Jim has a problem with anyone else's success, not just ours. Do we get along? No, but we don't have to."

United States Women's national basketball team
Auriemma was named head coach of the US women's team that competed in the Junior World Championship in Brno, Czech Republic during July 2001.  The team won its first five games, including a record-setting win against Mali.  The 97–27 final score represented the largest margin of victory by a USA team in Junior World Championship history. The preliminary round results qualified the team for the medal rounds, where they faced the host team, the Czech Republic. With a home crowd cheering them on, the Czech team won 92–88 and went on to beat Russia 82–80 to win the gold medal.  The US team beat Australia 77–72 to win the bronze medal. Diana Taurasi was the leading scorer for the US with 19.3 points per game, while Alana Beard was close behind with 18.0 points per game. Nicole Powell was the leading rebounder for the US, with seven rebounds per game.

Auriemma was named head coach of the US Women's National team in preparation for competition in the 2010 World Championships and 2012 Olympics. Because many team members were still playing in the WNBA until just prior to the World Championship, the team had only one day of practice with the entire team before leaving for Ostrava and Karlovy Vary, Czech Republic.  Despite this the team won its first games against Greece by 26 points.  The team continued to dominate with victory margins exceeding 20 points in the first five games. Several players shared scoring  honors, with Swin Cash, Angel McCoughtry, Maya Moore, Diana Taurasi, Lindsay Whalen, and Sylvia Fowles all ending as high scorer in the first few games. The sixth game was against undefeated Australia — the USA jumped out to a 24-point lead and won 83–75.  Team USA won its next two games by over 30 points, then faced the host team, the Czech Republic, in the championship game. They had a five-point lead at halftime, which was cut to three points, but the Czechs never got closer.   Team USA won the championship and gold medal. At the 2012 Olympics, Auriemma's team went 8–0 and won the gold medal game over France 86–50. Their closest match of the Olympics – and the only game in which their margin of victory was less than 25 points – was an 86–73 win in the semi-finals over eventual Bronze Medal winner Australia.

Auriemma was again named head coach of the US Women's Basketball team for the 2014 FIBA World Championship for Women and the 2016 Summer Olympics. In the 2014 World Championship, his team went 6–0 and won the gold medal, outscoring their opponents 553–380 over the six games – an average margin of victory of almost 30 points per game.

Head coaching record

1. Cancelled due to the coronavirus pandemic

Other activities
During the college basketball offseason, Auriemma serves as an analyst for games of the Women's National Basketball Association broadcast on the American cable television networks ESPN and ESPN2, in which he often critiques his former players.

Auriemma is close friends with former Saint Joseph's University basketball head coach Phil Martelli and his son, Mike Auriemma, attended and played basketball at Saint Joseph's.

Auriemma served as an assistant coach to the gold medalist 2000 U.S. Olympic Team.  On April 15, 2009 he was selected to lead USA Basketball Women's National Team in the 2010 FIBA World Championship in the Czech Republic and the London 2012 Summer Olympics.

Auriemma is a member of the Board of Directors of the Kay Yow/WBCA Cancer Fund.

Auriemma is a member of the board of directors at Connecticut Children's Foundation, Inc. and hosts a charity series of events, Geno for the Kids, every year benefiting Connecticut Children's Medical Center.

Auriemma has parlayed his heritage and his love of Italian cuisine into lines of wines and sauces along with several restaurants in Connecticut.

Awards and honors
1989
 Big East Conference Coach of the Year

1995
 USBWA National Coach of the Year
 Naismith College Coach of the Year
 Associated Press College Basketball Coach of the Year
 Big East Conference Coach of the Year (2)

1997
 WBCA National Coach of the Year
 Naismith College Coach of the Year (2)
 Associated Press College Basketball Coach of the Year (2)
 Big East Conference Coach of the Year (3)

2000
 WBCA National Coach of the Year (2)
 Naismith College Coach of the Year (3)
 Associated Press College Basketball Coach of the Year (3)
 Big East Conference Coach of the Year (4)

2002
 WBCA National Coach of the Year (3)
 Naismith College Coach of the Year (4)
 Big East Conference Coach of the Year (5)

2003
 USBWA National Coach of the Year (2)
 Associated Press College Basketball Coach of the Year (4)
 Big East Conference Coach of the Year (6)

2006
 Induction into the Basketball Hall of Fame in Springfield, Massachusetts
 Induction into the Women's Basketball Hall of Fame in Knoxville, Tennessee

2007
 Induction into the National Italian American Sports Hall of Fame

2008
 USBWA National Coach of the Year (3)
 WBCA National Coach of the Year (4)
 Naismith College Coach of the Year (5)
 Associated Press College Basketball Coach of the Year (5)
 Big East Conference Coach of the Year (7)

2009
 USBWA National Coach of the Year (4)
 WBCA National Coach of the Year (5)
 Naismith College Coach of the Year (6)
 Associated Press College Basketball Coach of the Year (6)
 Big East Conference Coach of the Year (8)

2010
 Big East Conference Coach of the Year (9)

2011
 Associated Press College Basketball Coach of the Year (7)
 Big East Conference Coach of the Year (10)

2012
 John R. Wooden Legends of Coaching Award

2014
 American Athletic Conference Coach of the Year
 Named one of ESPNW's Impact 25

2015
 American Athletic Conference Coach of the Year (2)

2016
 USBWA National Coach of the Year (5)
 WBCA National Coach of the Year (6)
 Naismith College Coach of the Year (7)
 Associated Press College Basketball Coach of the Year (8)
 American Athletic Conference Coach of the Year (3)

2017
 USBWA National Coach of the Year (6)
 WBCA National Coach of the Year (7)
 Naismith College Coach of the Year (8)
 Associated Press College Basketball Coach of the Year (9)
 American Athletic Conference Coach of the Year (4)

2019
 American Athletic Conference Coach of the Year (5)

Records and achievements
 Highest winning percentage among NCAA basketball coaches (minimum 10 seasons), any level, men's or women's (.885)
 Most NCAA Division I Championships, men's or women's (11)
 Most NCAA Division I Final Fours, men's or women's (20)
 Most NCAA Division I Tournament wins, men's or women's (121)
 Fastest women's coach to 700, 800, 900, 1,000 and 1,100 wins
 Fastest coach to 800, 900, 1,000 and 1,100 wins, any level, men's or women's
 With men's coaches Jim Calhoun (2004) and Kevin Ollie (2014), the only coaches at the same Division I school to win the men's and women's NCAA Tournaments in the same season

See also
 List of college women's basketball coaches with 600 wins

References

Other references

External links
 
 Connecticut profile 

1954 births
Living people
American Olympic coaches
American women's basketball coaches
Basketball coaches from New Jersey
Basketball coaches from Pennsylvania
High school basketball coaches in Pennsylvania
Italian emigrants to the United States
Naismith Memorial Basketball Hall of Fame inductees
Naturalized citizens of the United States
People from Avalon, New Jersey
Sportspeople from the Province of Avellino
People from Norristown, Pennsylvania
Saint Joseph's Hawks women's basketball coaches
Sportspeople from Cape May County, New Jersey
Sportspeople from Montgomery County, Pennsylvania
UConn Huskies women's basketball coaches
United States women's national basketball team coaches
Virginia Cavaliers women's basketball coaches
West Chester University alumni